In particle, atomic and condensed matter physics, a Yukawa potential (also called a screened Coulomb potential) is a potential named after the Japanese physicist Hideki Yukawa. The potential is of the form:

In the SI system, the unit of the Yukawa potential is (1/meters).

The Coulomb potential of electromagnetism is an example of a Yukawa potential with the  factor equal to 1, everywhere. This can be interpreted as saying that the photon mass  is equal to 0. The photon is the force-carrier between interacting, charged particles.

In interactions between a meson field and a fermion field, the constant  is equal to the gauge coupling constant between those fields.  In the case of the nuclear force, the fermions would be a proton and another proton or a neutron.

History 
Prior to Hideki Yukawa's 1935 paper, physicists struggled to explain the results of James Chadwick's atomic model, which consisted of positively charged protons and neutrons packed inside of a small nucleus, with a radius on the order of 10−14 meters. Physicists knew that electromagnetic forces at these lengths would cause these protons to repel each other and for the nucleus to fall apart. Thus came the motivation for further explaining the interactions between elementary particles. In 1932, Werner Heisenberg proposed a "Platzwechsel" (migration) interaction between the neutrons and protons inside the nucleus, in which neutrons were composite particles of protons and electrons. These composite neutrons would emit electrons, creating an attractive force with the protons, and then turn into protons themselves. When, in 1933 at the Solvay Conference, Heisenberg proposed his interaction, physicists suspected it to be of either two forms:

on account of its short-range. However, there were many issues with his theory. The way Heisenberg treated this issue would go on to form the ideas of isospin.

Heisenberg's idea of an exchange interaction (rather than a Coulombic force) between particles inside the nucleus led Fermi to formulate his ideas on beta-decay in 1934. Fermi's neutron-proton interaction was not based on the "migration" of neutron and protons between each other. Instead, Fermi proposed the emission and absorption of two light particles: the neutrino and electron, rather than just the electron (as in Heisenberg's theory). While Fermi's interaction solved the issue of the conservation of linear and angular momentum, Soviet physicists Igor Tamm and Dmitri Ivanenko demonstrated that the force associated with the neutrino and electron emission was not strong enough to bind the protons and neutrons in the nucleus.

In his February 1935 paper, Hideki Yukawa combines both the idea of Heisenberg's short-range force interaction and Fermi's idea of an exchange particle in order to fix the issue of the neutron-proton interaction. He deduced a potential which includes an exponential decay term and an electromagnetic term. In analogy to quantum field theory, Yukawa knew that the potential and its corresponding field must be a result of an exchange particle. In the case of QED, this exchange particle was a photon of 0 mass. In Yukawa's case, the exchange particle had some mass, which was related to the range of interaction (given by ). Since the range of the nuclear force was known, Yukawa used his equation to predict the mass of the mediating particle as about 200 times the mass of the electron. Physicists called this particle the "meson," as its mass was in the middle of the proton and electron. Yukawa's meson was found in 1947, and came to be known as the pion.

Relation to Coulomb potential

If the particle has no mass (i.e.), then the Yukawa potential reduces to a Coulomb potential, and the range is said to be infinite. In fact, we have:

Consequently, the equation

simplifies to the form of the Coulomb potential

where we set the scaling constant to be:

A comparison of the long range potential strength for Yukawa and Coulomb is shown in Figure 2. It can be seen that the Coulomb potential has effect over a greater distance whereas the Yukawa potential approaches zero rather quickly. However, any Yukawa potential or Coulomb potential is non-zero for any large .

Fourier transform
The easiest way to understand that the Yukawa potential is associated with a massive field is by examining its Fourier transform. One has

where the integral is performed over all possible values of the 3-vector momenta . In this form, and setting the scaling factor to one, the fraction  is seen to be the propagator or Green's function of the Klein–Gordon equation.

Feynman amplitude

The Yukawa potential can be derived as the lowest order amplitude of the interaction of a pair of fermions. The Yukawa interaction couples the fermion field  to the meson field  with the coupling term

The scattering amplitude for two fermions, one with initial momentum  and the other with momentum , exchanging a meson with momentum , is given by the Feynman diagram on the right.

The line in the middle, connecting the two fermion lines, represents the exchange of a meson. Thus, we see that the Feynman amplitude for this graph is nothing more than

From the previous section, this is seen to be the Fourier transform of the Yukawa potential.

Eigenvalues of Schrödinger equation
The radial Schrödinger equation with Yukawa potential can be solved perturbatively. Using the radial Schrödinger equation in the form

and the Yukawa potential in the power-expanded form

and setting , one obtains for the angular momentum  the expression

Setting all coefficients  except  equal to zero, one obtains the well-known expression for the Schrödinger eigenvalue for the Coulomb potential, and the radial quantum number   is a positive integer or zero as a consequence of the boundary conditions which the wave functions of the Coulomb potential have to satisfy. In the case of the Yukawa potential the imposition of boundary conditions is more complicated. Thus in the Yukawa case  is only an approximation and the parameter  that replaces the integer  is really an asymptotic expansion like that above with first approximation the integer value of the corresponding Coulomb case.
The above expansion for the orbital angular momentum or Regge trajectory  can be reversed to obtain the energy eigenvalues or equivalently . One obtains:

The above asymptotic expansion of the angular momentum  in descending powers of  can also be derived with the WKB method. That this reasoning is correct follows from the WKB derivation of the correct result in the Coulomb case (with the Langer correction), and even of the above expansion in the Yukawa case with higher order WKB approximations.

Cross section 
We can calculate the differential cross section between a proton or neutron and the pion by making use of the Yukawa potential. We use the Born approximation, which tells us that, in a spherically symmetrical potential, we can approximate the outgoing scattered wave function as the sum of incoming plane wave function and a small perturbation:

where  is the particle's incoming momentum. The function  is given by:

We calculate  by plugging in :

Evaluating the integral gives

Energy conservation implies

so that

Plugging in, we get:

We thus get a differential cross section of:

Integrating, the total cross section is:

See also
Yukawa interaction
Screened Poisson equation
Bessel potential

References

Sources
 

Gauge theories
Scattering theory
Quantum mechanical potentials